Romani CRISS (full name: Romani Center for Social Intervention and Studies, or Centrul Romilor pentru Intervenţie Socială şi Studii in Romania) is a Romanian non-government organisation which seeks to protect the rights of the country's Romani minority and to prevent discrimination against the Roma, who officially make up 3.3% of the country's population as of 2011, with an unofficial 2002 estimate of between 1.5 and 2 million, representing at least 8-9% of the population. It also conducts a series of projects in order to improve the situation of the Roma in education and health care. Romani CRISS was founded on April 4, 1993, and its executive director 2005-2012 was Margareta Matache. Its current executive director is Marian Mandache.

See also
Aven Amentza (another Romani NGO based in Romania)
National Agency for the Roma

References

External links
 Romani CRISS

Human rights organizations based in Romania
Romani in Romania
Romani rights
1993 establishments in Romania
Organizations established in 1993